Saint-Perdoux may refer to the following places in France:

 Saint-Perdoux, Dordogne, a commune in the Dordogne department
 Saint-Perdoux, Lot, a commune in the Lot department